Jane Margaret Jacobs (born 2 May 1958) is an Australian academic, currently serving as Professor of Social Sciences at Yale-NUS College and formerly as Professor of Cultural Geography, in the School of Geosciences at the University of Edinburgh. She was previously at the University of Melbourne. Jacobs' work has focused on Postcolonialism; indigenous rights and identity; race and racism; cultural politics of urban space; high-rise housing and modernity; and the politics of cultural heritage. Jacobs has published several books, many book chapters and articles in peer-reviewed international scholarly journals. In 2016, she was elected a fellow of the British Academy.

Selected publications

Books

 Gelder, K. and Jacobs, J.M. (1998) Uncanny Australia: Sacredness and Identity in a Postcolonial Nation, University of Melbourne Press, Melbourne
 Jacobs, J.M. (1996) Edge of Empire: Postcolonialism and the City, Routledge, London & New York, 186 pp.
 Jacobs, J.M. and Gale, F. (1994) Tourism and the Protection of Aboriginal Cultural Sites, Australian Heritage Commission, Canberra, 146 pp.
 Gale, F. and Jacobs, J.M. (1987) Tourists and the National Estate: Procedures to Protect Australia's Heritage, Australian Heritage Commission, Canberra, 116 pp.

Edited books

 Fincher, R. and Jacobs, J.M. (1998) Cities of Difference, Guilford, New York, 322 pp.
 Gibson, K., Huxley, M., Cameron, J., Costello, L., Fincher, R., Jacobs, J.M., Jamieson, N., Johnson, L. and Pulvirenti, M. (1996) Restructuring Difference: Social Polarisation and the City, Australian Housing and Urban Research Institute, Melbourne, 114 pp.
 Jacobs, J.M. and Liepins, R. (1994) Rural Women: Exploring Research Agendas. In Department of geography and Environmental Studies, University of Melbourne, Research Paper 1, Melbourne, 45 pp.

References

External links
 Staff information at University of Edinburgh

1958 births
Living people
Australian geographers
Australian non-fiction writers
Place of birth missing (living people)
Academics of the University of Edinburgh
Academic staff of the University of Melbourne
Women geographers
Corresponding Fellows of the British Academy